Butler College (founded 1983) is one of six residential colleges at Princeton University.

Butler College may also refer to:
Butler University, formerly Butler College, a university in Indianapolis, Indiana, US, founded in 1855
Butler College (Texas), a historically black college in Tyler, Texas, US, in existence from 1905 to 1972
Josephine Butler College, Durham, a college at Durham University, UK, founded in 2006
Butler College (Perth), a high school in Butler, Perth, Western Australia, opened in 2013

See also
Butler College Preparatory High School, a high school in Chicago, Illinois, US
Butler Community College, a community college in Kansas, US
Butler County Community College, a community college in Pennsylvania, US
Butler High School (disambiguation)